The Men's 200 Individual Medley event at the 10th FINA World Aquatics Championships swam 24–25 July 2003 in Barcelona, Spain. Preliminary and Semifinal heats swam July 24; the Final was July 25.

At the start of the event, the existing World (WR) and Championship (CR) records were both:
WR: 1:57.94 swum by Michael Phelps (USA) on June 29, 2003 in Santa Clara, USA
CR: 1:58.16 swum by Jani Sievinen (Finland) on September 11, 1994 in Rome, Italy

Results

Final

Semifinals

Preliminaries

References

Swimming at the 2003 World Aquatics Championships